Adolfus kibonotensis, also known as Jackson's forest lizard (vernacular name shared with Adolfus jacksoni), is a species of lizard found in Kenya and Tanzania. It was originally described as a subspecies of Adolfus jacksoni in 1907 before being reduced into a synonym, but was resurrected as a full species in 2018.

References

Adolfus
Lacertid lizards of Africa
Reptiles of Kenya
Reptiles of Tanzania
Reptiles described in 1907
Taxa named by Einar Lönnberg